Milan Škobalj (born 9 July 1963) is a Serbian professional basketball coach and former player. He was head coach of Rostock Seawolves until January 2020 in the German ProA.

Coaching career 
Škobalj had worked as an assistant coach in FMP Železnik for three seasons before he became the assistant coach of Crvena zvezda in 2001. In 2008 had a stint as a head coach of Crvena zvezda after Stevan Karadžić resign. In 2008–09 season he was an assistant coach of Kyiv in Ukrainian League.

Škobalj was an assistant coach of Dragan Šakota in the national team of Serbia and Montenegro at the 2006 FIBA World Championship in Japan.

In 2009, Škobalj was hired as the head coach of the Hørsholm 79ers in the Danish league, Basketligaen. He received Basketligaen Coach of the Year honors in the 2009–10 season. From 2012 until 2014, he coached two clubs in the Moroccan League, Sport Plazza in Casablanca and Amal in Essaouira. In 2015, he was hired as the head coach of Eos Herrlag in Lund, Sweden.

On 9 May 2016, he was named the head coach of Team FOG Næstved of the Danish League. In May 2018, he signed for the Rostock Seawolves of the German 2nd-tier league. In January 2020, he was replaced by Dirk Bauermann.

Personal life 
His son Filip Škobalj (born 2002) is a basketball player.
His eldest son … (born 1987) is also basketball player of KK Salamala.

See also 
 List of KK Crvena zvezda head coaches

References

External links
 Milan Skobalj at eurobasket.com

1963 births
Living people
Basketball players from Belgrade
KK Crvena zvezda head coaches
KK Crvena zvezda assistant coaches
Serbian men's basketball coaches
Serbian expatriate basketball people in Denmark
Serbian expatriate basketball people in Germany
Serbian expatriate basketball people in Morocco
Serbian expatriate basketball people in Sweden
Serbian expatriate basketball people in Ukraine